The Parma Mikron III UL is a Czech aircraft engine, developed from the Walter Mikron and produced by Parma Technik sro of Luhačovice for use in ultralight aircraft.

Design and development
The Mikron III UL is a four-cylinder four-stroke, in-line,  displacement, air-cooled, direct-drive, gasoline engine design. It employs dual magnetos and produces  at 2760 rpm, with a compression ratio of 7.0:1.

Specifications (Mikron III UL)

See also

References

External links

Parma Technik aircraft engines
Air-cooled aircraft piston engines
2010s aircraft piston engines